The Best Male Athlete ESPY Award, known alternatively as the Outstanding Male Athlete ESPY Award, is an annual award honoring the achievements of individual men from the world of sports. It has been presented annually at the ESPY Awards (Excellence in Sports Performance Yearly Award) since 1993 to the male voted irrespective of nationality or sport contested, adjudged to be the best athlete in a given calendar year. The Best Male Athlete ESPY Award trophy, designed by sculptor Lawrence Nowlan, is presented to the recipient at an annual ceremony in Los Angeles. Since 2004, the winner has been chosen by online balloting through three to five choices selected by the ESPN Select Nominating Committee. Before that, determination of the winners was made by an panel of experts. Through the 2001 iteration of the ESPY Awards, ceremonies were conducted in February of each year to honor achievements over the previous calendar year; awards presented thereafter are conferred in July and reflect performance from the June previous.

The inaugural winner of the Best Male Athlete ESPY Award was basketball player Michael Jordan in 1993. Three American athletes, golfer Tiger Woods, road cyclist Lance Armstrong, and basketball player LeBron James, have won the award multiple times. Woods was honored five times: in 1998 (jointly with baseball player Ken Griffey Jr.), 2000, 2001, 2002 and 2008. Armstrong was honored four times from 2003 to 2006 inclusive while James received the trophy on three occasions in 2012, 2013 and 2016. Basketball is the most successful sport, its players having received a total of nine awards and thirty-two nominations since its inception, followed by Golf players with five wins and ten nominations. The award has been won by a non-American four times – in 2011 by German basketball player Dirk Nowitzki, in 2018 by Russian hockey player Alex Ovechkin, in 2019 by Greek basketball player Giannis Antetokounmpo and in 2022 by Japanese baseball player Shohei Ohtani. All four were playing for American teams. It was not awarded in 2020 due to the COVID-19 pandemic. , the last American recipient the Best Male Athlete ESPY Award was football player Tom Brady in 2021.

Winners and nominees

Statistics

See also
Best Female Athlete ESPY Award
Best International Athlete ESPY Award

Notes

References

External links
 

ESPY Awards
United States Espy Male
Awards established in 1993